Rian is both a given name and a surname. Notable people with the name include:

Given name
 Rian Antonelli (born 1991), American comedian, musician 
 Rian Dawson, drummer for American pop punk band All Time Low
 Rian Hughes, British graphic designer, illustrator, and comics artist
 Rian James (1899–1953), American screenwriter
 Rian Johnson (born 1973), American film director, writer, and producer
 Rian Lindell (born 1977), American National Football League placekicker
 Rian Malan (born 1954), South African author, journalist, and songwriter 
 Rian Marques (born 1982), Brazilian footballer currently playing in Thailand
 Rian Sukmawan (born 1984), Indonesian professional badminton player
 Rian Wallace (born 1982), American former football player
Rian, a fictional character from Jim Henson's The Dark Crystal: Age of Resistance and J.M. Lee's tie-in novels

Surname
 Erlend Rian (1941–2020), Norwegian politician and newspaper editor
 Espen Rian (born 1981), Norwegian Nordic combined skier
 Johannes Rian (1891–1981), Norwegian painter
 Øystein Rian (born 1945), Norwegian historian, brother of Erlend Rian

See also
 Rianne, a feminine given name
 Rians (disambiguation), two places in France